The Early Years 1946–1957 is a five-disc compilation recording by American guitarist Chet Atkins, released in 2007.

History
The 158 tracks on this five-disc compilation cover Atkins' career from his very first single ("Guitar Blues") released on Bullet Records to 1957 and Finger Style Guitar. The selections include quite a few of Atkins' vocal performances, from the very earliest 78's he recorded. The releases are placed in chronological order, so following Atkins' career steps is both educational and enlightening — especially to those seeking to hear his development as a guitarist.

Discs four and five represent Atkins as one of Nashville's leading studio musicians as well as his own solo albums. The liner notes are extensive and include an essay by Drew Kent.

Reception

Allmusic stated in their review: "The result is an entertaining and compelling look at the formative years of a crucial figure in the growth of country music, and guitar fans will get a fine buzz from the first-class picking that graces nearly every cut."

Personnel
Chet Atkins – guitar, vocals
Rosalie Allen – vocals
James Atkins – guitar
Billie Rose Atkins – vocals
George Barnes – guitar
Beasley Singers – vocals
Joe Biviano – accordion
Harold Bradley – guitar
Jethro Burns – mandolin, vocals
Jerry Byrd – lap steel guitar
Fran Carroll – bass
Anita Carter – bass
Helen Carter – vocals
Al Chernet – guitar
Donna Colleen – vocals
Farris Coursey – drums
Johnny Degeorge – drums
Danny Dill – vocals
Ray Edenton – guitar
Austin Footrell – vocals
Malcolm Gold – organ, piano
"Papa" John Gordie – celeste, piano
Buddy Harman – drums
Henry "Homer" Haynes – guitar, vocals
Marvin Hughes – organ, piano, celeste
Charles Hurta – fiddle
Louis Innis – guitar, vocals
Bud Isaacs – pedal steel guitar
Aaron Kerr – organ
Anita Kerr – vocals, choral arrangements
Red Kirk – vocals
Millie Kirkham – vocals
Angus P Klein – accordion
Phil Kraus – drums
Buck Lambert – fiddle
Randy Lanham – guitar
Grady Martin – guitar
Elbert R. "Dutch" McMillan – clarinet
Ernie Newton – bass
Dale Potter – fiddle
Jack Shook – guitar
Harold Siegel – bass
Hank Snow – guitar, vocals
Brock Speer – vocals
"Holly" Swanson – bass

References

2007 compilation albums
Chet Atkins compilation albums